The Mazzaspitz (3,164 m) is a mountain of the Oberhalbstein Alps, overlooking Juf in the canton of Graubünden. It lies south of Piz Platta, on the range between the valley of Avers and the Val Bercla.

References

External links
 Mazzaspitz on Hikr

Mountains of the Alps
Mountains of Switzerland
Mountains of Graubünden
Avers